The Russian U-20 women's national football team is the national under-20 women's association football team of Russia, which is controlled by the Russian Football Union (RFS). They have won the UEFA European Women's Under-19 Championship in 2005 defeating France on penalties.

On 28 February 2022, due to the 2022 Russian invasion of Ukraine and in accordance with a recommendation by the International Olympic Committee (IOC), FIFA and UEFA suspended the participation of Russia, including in the Qatar 2022 World Cup. The Russian Football Union unsuccessfully appealed the FIFA and UEFA bans to the Court of Arbitration for Sport, which upheld the bans.

Records

U-20 World Cup record

Honours

FIFA U-20 Women's World Cup

 FIFA Fair Play Award: 2006

UEFA Women's Under-19 Championship
 Winners: 2005

Individual
 Golden Player: Elena Danilova (2005)
 Top Scorer: Elena Danilova (2005, 2006)

See also
 Russia women's national football team (Senior)
 Russia women's national under-17 football team
 Russia men's national under-20 football team
 Football in Russia

References

External links
 Russian Football Union Website

u-20
European women's national under-20 association football teams
Women's national under-19 association football teams